Callicoon National Bank, also known as Delaware Free Library, is a historic bank building located at Callicoon in Sullivan County, New York.  It was built in 1913 and is a two-story masonry building, rectangular in plan with a flat roof.  The symmetrical bluestone facade features a pedimented entrance with Ionic order columns in antis.  A bank occupied the building until 1967; in 1970 it was occupied by the library.

It was added to the National Register of Historic Places in 1994.

References

Commercial buildings on the National Register of Historic Places in New York (state)
Libraries on the National Register of Historic Places in New York (state)
Neoclassical architecture in New York (state)
Commercial buildings completed in 1913
Buildings and structures in Sullivan County, New York
1913 establishments in New York (state)
Libraries established in 1970
National Register of Historic Places in Sullivan County, New York